The Nebraska Cornhuskers football statistical leaders are the individual statistical leaders of the Nebraska Cornhuskers football program in various categories, including passing, rushing, receiving, total offense, defensive stats, and kicking. The  Cornhuskers compete as part of the NCAA Division I Football Bowl Subdivision, representing the University of Nebraska–Lincoln in the West Division of the Big Ten.                 
                     
Although Nebraska began competing in intercollegiate football in 1890, the school's official record book considers the "modern era" to have begun in 1956. Records before this are often incomplete and inconsistent, and are generally not included. These lists are dominated by recent players for several reasons, including: college football's progressively increasing season length, an NCAA statute forbidding freshmen from playing varsity football that was in place until 1972, and the exclusion of bowl game stats from official records until 2002.

Passing

Yards

Touchdowns

Rushing

Yards

Touchdowns

Receiving

Receptions

Yards

Touchdowns

Total offense
Total offense is the sum of passing, rushing, and receiving yards.

All-purpose yards
All-purpose yardage is the sum of rushing, receiving, kick return, and punt return yardage.

Scoring

Points

Touchdowns

Defense

Interceptions

Tackles

Sacks

Tackles for loss

Pass breakups

Special teams

Field goals made

Longest field goal

Field goal percentage

Punting

Punt returns

Kick returns

References

Nebraska